Brent Belecki (born December 22, 1977 in Calgary, Alberta) is a former professional ice hockey goaltender who played in the Western Hockey League, East Coast Hockey League, Central Hockey League, United Hockey League, and American Hockey League.

In the 1997-1998, as a junior, he won the WHL's top goaltender award and the WHL playoff Most Valuable Player award. Belecki backstopped the Portland Winter Hawks to the CHL's highest honor, the 1998 Memorial Cup. However, due to his small size (5-9, 175 lbs), Belecki was never drafted by a National Hockey League team.

As a professional, Belecki played for teams including the Miami Matadors, the Huntsville Channel Cats, the Asheville Smoke, the San Antonio Iguanas, the Utah Grizzlies, the Corpus Christi Rayz, the Austin Ice Bats, and the Muskegon Fury.

Awards and achievements
 Named to the WHL West First All-Star Team in 1998

References

External links 

1977 births
Asheville Smoke players
Austin Ice Bats players
Canadian ice hockey goaltenders
Charlotte Checkers (1993–2010) players
Corpus Christi Icerays players
Corpus Christi Rayz players
Fort Worth Brahmas players
Greensboro Generals players
Hampton Roads Admirals players
Huntington Blizzard players
Huntsville Channel Cats (CHL) players
Living people
Miami Matadors players
Muskegon Fury players
Ice hockey people from Calgary
Portland Winterhawks players
Richmond RiverDogs players
San Antonio Iguanas players
Utah Grizzlies (AHL) players
Canadian expatriate ice hockey players in the United States